Hermeneutic Communism: from Heidegger to Marx is a 2011 book of political philosophy and Marxist hermeneutics by Gianni Vattimo and Santiago Zabala.

Contents and arguments 
The authors explain the book as follows "Although the material published here has never been released before, there are two books that have determined the production of this text: Gianni’s Ecce Comu: Come si diventa cio che si era (2007) and Santiago’s The Remains of Being: Hermeneutic Ontology After Metaphysics (2009). In the former, Vattimo emphasized the political necessity of reevaluating communism; in the latter, Zabala insisted on the progressive nature of hermeneutics. Hermeneutic Communism can be considered a radical development of both." In 2004, after leaving the party of the Democrats of the Left, he endorsed Marxism, reassessing positively its projectual principles and wishing for a "return" to the thought of Karl Marx and to a communism, rid of distorted Soviet developments, which have to be dialectically overcome. Vattimo asserts the continuity of his new choices with the "weak thought," thus having changed "many of his ideas." He namely refers to a "weakened Marx," as ideological basis capable of showing the real nature of communism. The new Marxist approach, therefore, emerges as a practical development of the "weak thought" into the frame of a political perspective.

Part 1 of the book is called "Framed Democracy" in which he characterizes contemporary capitalism as "Armed capitalism". Also while analysing current Western parliamentary democracies he speaks of "A politics of descriptions does not impose power in order to dominate as a philosophy; rather, it is functional for the continued existence of a society of dominion, which pursues truth in the form of imposition (violence), conservation (realism), and triumph (history)."  Part II is called "Hermeneutic Communism" where he talks of "Interpretation as Anarchy" and affirms that "existence is interpretation" and "hermeneutics is weak thought". Afterwards advocates a "weakened communism" and praises as models for change the contemporary Latin American left wing governments such as those of Hugo Chavez in Venezuela, Evo Morales in Bolivia and Lula in Brazil. For him "this new weak communism differs substantially from its previous Soviet (and current Chinese) realization, because the South American countries follow democratic electoral procedures and also manage to decentralize the state bureaucratic system through the misiones (social missions for community projects). In sum, if weakened communism is felt as a specter in the West, it is not only because of media distortions but also for the altemative it represents through the same democratic procedures that the West constantly professes to cherish but is hesitant to apply".

The authors dedicate the book to "Castro, Chavez, Lula, and Morales."

Response
In 2017, S. Mazzini and O. Glyn-Williams released a book on Hermeneutic Communism published by Springer Verlag, Making Communism Hermeneutic: Reading Vattimo and Zabala, with critical contributions from 17 renowned scholars from all over the world as well as Vattimo and Zabala's responses.

Reviews

"Hermeneutic Communism is much more than a beautifully written essay in political philosophy, reaching from ontological premises to concrete political analyses: it provides a coherent communist vision from the standpoint of Heideggerian postmetaphysical hermeneutics. All those who criticize postmodern ‘weak thought’ for its inability to ground radical political practice will have to admit their mistake—Gianni Vattimo and Santiago Zabala demonstrate that weak thought does not mean weak action but is the very resort of strong radical change. This is a book that everyone who thinks about radical politics needs like the air he or she breathes!" — Slavoj Žižek, author of Living in the End Times

"Those interested in the potential for theoretical reformulations made possible by postfoundational political thought and those following the rebellion of marginal sectors of society have a lot to learn from this remarkable book." — Ernesto Laclau, author of On Populist Reason

"Hermeneutic Communism is one of those rare books that seamlessly combines postmetaphysical philosophy and political practice, the task of a meticulous ontological interpretation and decisive revolutionary action, the critique of intellectual hegemony and a positive, creative thought. Vattimo and Zabala, unlike Michael Hardt and Antonio Negri, do not offer their readers a readymade political ontology but allow radical politics to germinate from each singular and concrete act of interpretation. This is the most significant event of twenty-first-century philosophy!" — Michael Marder, author of Groundless Existence: The Political Ontology of Carl Schmitt

"The authors argue that ‘weak thought,’ or an antifoundational hermeneutics, will allow social movements to avoid both the violence attending past struggles and, if triumphant, a falling back into routines of domination—the restoration of what Jean-Paul Sartre called the ‘practico-inert.’ Vattimo and Zabala end with Latin America as a case study of applied weak thought politics, where the left in recent years has had remarkable success at the polls." — Greg Grandin, New York University

"The work of Vattimo and Zabala clears a new stage for political theorizing based on a careful probe of the current state of destitution and hidden edges of social vitality. While I do not always agree with the conclusions drawn by these marvelous writers, I thank them for sparking an essential debate and replenishing our critical vocabularies." — Avital Ronell, New York University and the European Graduate School

"...action-packed..." — Asia Times

"...Vattimo and Zabala offer a refreshing alternative to the hegemonic discourse, a breath of fresh air from the violent imposition of “metaphysics” by those in power." — Ceasefire Magazine

"Despite its thin profile the content itself is formidable in achieving both its critical and scholarly aims." — Maxwell Kennel, Symposium: Canadian Journal of Continental Philosophy, Issue 16.2 (2012): 251-259.

References

External links
We Are Not Communists—We Are "Hermeneutic Communists," by Vattimo and Zabala in ARCADE 2016
Interview with Gianni Vattimo and Santiago Zabala
Santiago Zabala's New York Times op-ed How To Be a European (Union) Philosopher
Review from Marx & Philosophy Review of Books
Interview with Santiago Zabala
Maduro is not Chavez by Santiago Zabala

2011 non-fiction books
Books about communism
Books about democracy
Continental philosophy literature
Books about hermeneutics
Books in political philosophy
Communist books
Marxist books
Marxist theory
Columbia University Press books